The 1935 Duke Blue Devils football team was an American football team that represented Duke University as a member of the Southern Conference during the 1935 college football season. In its fifth season under head coach Wallace Wade, the team compiled an 8–2 record (5–0 against conference opponents), won the conference championship, and outscored opponents by a total of 214 to 45.  James Johnston was the team captain. The team played its home games at Duke Stadium in Durham, North Carolina.

Schedule

References

Duke
Duke Blue Devils football seasons
Southern Conference football champion seasons
Duke Blue Devils football